Golevka is the first full-length album by Swiss post-rock band The Evpatoria Report. It was released through Shayo Records on 7 April 2005, re-issued by Twilight Records in 2008 as a digipak then released again in 2009 by Pastel Music as a bundle with the band's self-titled EP. The album was recorded by Serge Morattel at Rec Studio in Geneva then mastered by Glenn Miller at Greenwood Mastering Studios in Nunningen. The album is named after the 6489 Golevka asteroid studied in 1991 by the Yevpatoria RT-70 radio telescope in Ukraine.

The second track Taijin Kyofusho includes samples of the last communications between CAPCOM Charles O. Hobaugh and commander of the Space Shuttle Columbia Rick D. Husband minutes before it disintegrated during reentry in 2003.

Track listing
All songs composed by The Evpatoria Report.

Personnel
The Evpatoria Report
 Laurent Quint – guitar
 Simon Robert – guitar
 David Di Lorenzo – bass
 Fabrice Berney – drums, glockenspiel
 Daniel Bacsinszky – violin, keyboard
Production
 Serge Morattel – engineering, mixing
 Glenn Miller – mastering
 Fabian Sbarro – artwork, design, photography
Additional musicians
 Laurent Macquat – bass on tracks 1, 4
 David Di Lorenzo – bass on tracks 2, 3

References

2005 debut albums
The Evpatoria Report albums